Sainte-Gertrude-Manneville is a municipality in the Canadian province of Quebec, located in Abitibi Regional County Municipality. It includes the population centres of Sainte-Gertrude-de-Villeneuve and Manneville.

The municipality had a population of 757 in the 2011 Canadian Census. It is part of the census agglomeration of Amos.

Demographics
Population trend:
 Population in 2011: 757 (2006 to 2011 population change: -6.7%)
 Population in 2006: 811
 Population in 2001: 785
 Population in 1996: 809
 Population in 1991: 779

Private dwellings occupied by usual residents: 284 (total dwellings: 294)

Mother tongue:
 English as first language: 0%
 French as first language: 100%
 English and French as first language: 0%
 Other as first language: 0%

Municipal council
 Mayor:  Pascal Rheault
 Councillors: Régis Audet, Huguette Chartier, Julie Frappier, Ghislaine Vachon, Jonathan Vachon

References

Municipalities in Quebec
Incorporated places in Abitibi-Témiscamingue